Yvonne Elisabeth Marie Antoinette Timmerman-Buck (born 26 July 1956) is a Dutch politician of the Christian Democratic Appeal (CDA) party and jurist. She has been a Member of the Council of State since 1 November 2009.

Early life
Timmerman-Buck was born in Kerkrade on 26 July 1956. Her father Werner Buck was a politician of the Catholic People's Party and was State Secretary of Housing, Spatial Planning and the Environment in the Cabinet Biesheuvel I.

Career
Timmerman-Buck was vice president of the Dutch Equal Treatment Commission from 1994 until 2001.

Timmerman-Buck was a Senator from June 1999 until November 2009. She was President of the Senate in the period 2003–2009, the first female to have the position. Timmerman-Buck has been a member of the State Council since 1 November 2009.

Personal life
Timmerman-Buck has been married to Maximiliaan Timmerman since 1981.

Decorations

References

External links

Official
  Mr. Y.E.M.A. (Yvonne) Timmerman-Buck Parlement & Politiek
  Mr. Y.E.M.A. Timmerman-Buck (CDA) Eerste Kamer der Staten-Generaal

 
 

 

 
 

1956 births
Living people
Christian Democratic Appeal politicians
Dutch academic administrators
Dutch nonprofit directors
Dutch nonprofit executives
Dutch Roman Catholics
Dutch public broadcasting administrators
Dutch women jurists
Knights of the Order of Orange-Nassau
Members of the Council of State (Netherlands)
Members of the Senate (Netherlands)
People from Kerkrade
Politicians from The Hague
Presidents of the Senate (Netherlands)
Tilburg University alumni
Women legislative speakers
20th-century Dutch civil servants
20th-century Dutch women politicians
20th-century Dutch politicians
21st-century Dutch civil servants
21st-century Dutch women politicians
21st-century Dutch politicians